Andrew R. Lang is an American politician and Republican member of the Minnesota Senate. He represents District 17, which includes portions of Chippewa, Kandiyohi, Renville, and Swift Counties in west-central Minnesota. Lang is a major in the Minnesota Army National Guard.

Early life, education, and career
Lang grew up in Kandiyohi, Minnesota, and graduated from Willmar High School in 1997. He attended Ridgewater College before transferring to St. Cloud State University, where he graduated with a bachelor's degree in aviation science and management.

Lang joined the Minnesota Army National Guard in 2002 and became a commissioned officer in 2003. He was stationed in Balad, Iraq, from April 2007 to August 2008. In June 2014, he participated in Operation Enduring Freedom and later Operation Inherent Resolve. Lang is a major and a logistics officer in the 34th Aviation Brigade. In addition to flying Black Hawk helicopters for the National Guard, he is a pilot for North Memorial Health Air Care. He was previously the parks supervisor for Renville County.

Minnesota Senate
In his first run for public office, Lang was elected to the Minnesota Senate in 2016, defeating DFL incumbent Lyle Koenen. Lang serves as vice chair of the Senate Veterans and Military Affairs Finance and Policy Committee.

Personal life
Lang and his wife, Susan, have two children and reside in Olivia. They are members of the Cross of Calvary Lutheran Church in Olivia.

References

External links

 Official Senate website
 Official campaign website

Living people
Republican Party Minnesota state senators
21st-century American politicians
People from Kandiyohi County, Minnesota
People from Olivia, Minnesota
1979 births